Lorenzo Gray (born March 4, 1958) is an American former player. He played a total of 58 games in the majors, mostly at third base.

He is a relative of author Ahuvah Gray.

Sources

1958 births
Living people
American expatriate baseball players in Canada
Appleton Foxes players
Baseball players from Mississippi
Chicago White Sox players
Columbus Clippers players
Denver Bears players
Glens Falls White Sox players
Gulf Coast White Sox players
Edmonton Trappers players
Knoxville Sox players
Major League Baseball third basemen
Maine Guides players
People from Mound Bayou, Mississippi
San Jose Bees players